La Baronnie is a commune in the department of Eure, northern France. The municipality was established on 1 January 2016 by merger of the former communes of Garencières and Quessigny.

See also 
Communes of the Eure department

References 

Communes of Eure
Populated places established in 2016
2016 establishments in France